DC Showcase: Sgt. Rock is an American animated short war superhero film based on the titular character directed by DC animated universe veteran Bruce Timm, written by Louise Simonson, Walter Simonson and Tim Sheridan and produced by Warner Bros. Animation and DC Entertainment. The short was included as part of the home media release of Batman: Hush.

It is the first DC Showcase installment in eight years since DC Showcase: Catwoman.

Plot
Waking up months after his squadron was killed in a fierce battle and recovering from his injuries, Sgt. Rock is tasked by Lt. Matthew Shrieve to capture a German Nazi scientist, giving him the top secret Creature Commandos at his service. The Commandos consist of Pvt. Warren Griffith, a wolfman hybrid, Sgt. Vincent Velcoro, a vampire, and Pvt. Elliot "Lucky" Taylor, a Frankenstein-like Monster. The squad was to infiltrate a medieval castle and capture the Nazi scientist and his assistant alive. Sgt. Rock had to keep his men restrained from going overboard especially Velcoro who was literally bloodthirsty saying "Nazi soldiers are human beings, not food" when they took out a German patrol near the castle. They quietly entered the castle and found the scientist but they got ambushed by Rock's archenemy the Iron Major and a fight ensures. The assistant scientist activated a switch to a generator powering a "rumored doomsday weapon" Sgt. Rock was informed by Lt. Shrieve but there was also a loud pounding sound coming from large steel doors in the laboratory. Taylor destroyed the generator and the steel doors burst open. Sgt. Rock, at first, thought reinforcements arrived when he saw what he believed were silhouettes of U.S. soldiers but Iron Major was laughing and then to his horror it was reveled that his squad Easy Company were revived as undead soldiers. The Creature Commandos managed to kill five of the zombies but they found out the generator that was destroyed was powering to revive Rock's friend Bulldozer. Bulldozer was a physically equal match to Taylor and both Velcoro and Griffith could not stop him either. Sgt. Rock managed to get a hold of his Thompson submachine gun and fired a full magazine, full auto burst at Bulldozer blowing the latters head off killing him. As the laboratory catches on fire, Iron Major and the scientists attempt to flee but Rock and the Commandos corner them. The Major gloats saying Rock will not shoot them because he has orders to take them alive so that the Americans can force them to build their own "army of the dead". Realizing this, Rock orders the Commandos to kill the Iron Major and the scientists and burn down the castle along with every trace of their research. Once outside, Rock order the Commandos to fall in as he is about to make a statement. He says that Lt. Shrieve has been taking them for granted and Rock has guaranteed he will do everything in his power so that never again will the Creature Commandos be deployed in battle in this manner. As they move out, Rock takes one last look at the burning castle knowing he has given Easy Company a proper cremation before he departs.

Cast
 Karl Urban as Sgt. Rock
 Keith Ferguson as Lt. Matthew Shrieve
 William Salyers as The Iron Major
 Audrey Wasilewski as Nurse

References

External links
 

2019 animated films
2019 direct-to-video films
2019 films
2019 short films
2010s Warner Bros. animated short films
2010s direct-to-video animated superhero films
American science fiction war films
Animated war films
DC Showcase